Fusari is an Italian surname. Notable people with the surname include:

 Antonio Fusari (born 1942), Italian footballer
 Charley Fusari (1924–1985), American boxer
 Rob Fusari, American music producer
 Stefano Fusari (born 1983), Italian footballer
 Tatiana Fusari, American murderer

Italian-language surnames